The 2022 Greek Cup Final was the 78th final of the Greek Football Cup. It took place on 21 May 2022 at Olympic Stadium, between Panathinaikos and PAOK. It was Panathinaikos' twenty-ninth Greek Cup Final and second consecutive, in their 114 years of existence and PAOK's twenty second Greek Cup Final and second consecutive, of their 97-year history.

Venue

This was the twenty sixth Greek Cup Final held at the Athens Olympic Stadium, after the 1983, 1984, 1985, 1986, 1987, 1988, 1989, 1990, 1993, 1994, 1995, 1996, 1999, 2000, 2002, 2009, 2010, 2011, 2012, 2013, 2014, 2015, 2016, 2018, 2019 and 2021 finals.

The Athens Olympic Stadium was built in 1982 and renovated in 2004. The stadium is used as a venue for AEK Athens and Greece and was used for Olympiacos and Panathinaikos in various occasions. Its current capacity is 69,618 and hosted 3 UEFA European Cup/Champions League Finals in 1983, 1994 and 2007, a UEFA Cup Winners' Cup Final in 1987, the 1991 Mediterranean Games and the 2004 Summer Olympics.

Background
Panathinaikos qualified for the Greek Cup Final twenty eight times, winning eighteen of them. They last played in a Final in 2014. They had won PAOK, 4–1.

PAOK qualified for the Greek Cup Final twenty one times, winning eight of them. They played in a Final in 2021. They had won Olympiacos, 2–1.

Route to the final

Match

Details

References

2022
Cup Final
Greek Cup Final 2022
Greek Cup Final 2022
Sports competitions in Athens
Greek Football Cup Final